In graph theory, the Games graph is the largest known locally linear strongly regular graph. Its parameters as a strongly regular graph are (729,112,1,20). This means that it has 729 vertices, and 40824 edges (112 per vertex). Each edge is in a unique triangle (it is a locally linear graph) and each non-adjacent pair of vertices have exactly 20 shared neighbors. It is named after Richard A. Games, who suggested its construction in an unpublished communication and wrote about related constructions.

Construction
The Games graph has as its vertices the 729 points of the affine space . Each line in the affine space goes through three of these points, and through a fourth point at infinity. The graph contains a triangle for every line of three affine points that passes through a point of the cap set.

Properties
Several of the graph's properties follow immediately from this construction. It has  vertices, because the number of points in an affine space is the size of the base field to the power of the dimension. For each affine point, there are 56 lines through cap set points, 56 triangles containing the corresponding vertex, and  neighbors of the vertex. But this would violate the defining property of a cap set that it has no three points on a line, so no such extra triangle can exist. The remaining property of strongly regular graphs, that all non-adjacent pairs of points have the same number of shared neighbors, depends on the specific properties of the 5-dimensional cap set.

Related graphs
With the  Rook's graph and the Brouwer–Haemers graph, the Games graph is one of only three possible strongly regular graphs whose parameters have the form .

This graph is the Berlekamp–Van Lint–Seidel graph.

References

Strongly regular graphs